Johan Gustav Jimmy Sjödin (born 1 December 1977) is a former Swedish diver. Born in Älvdalen, Dalarna, he competed in the men's 3 metre springboard and 10 metre platform events at the 1996 Summer Olympics.

Sjödin is openly gay, and, as of 2017, is engaged to Patrick Huber.

References

External links

1977 births
Living people
Divers at the 1996 Summer Olympics
Gay sportsmen
LGBT divers
Swedish LGBT sportspeople
Olympic divers of Sweden
People from Älvdalen Municipality
Swedish male divers
Sportspeople from Dalarna County
20th-century Swedish people